The 2016–17 California Golden Bears women's basketball team will represent University of California, Berkeley during the 2016–17 NCAA Division I women's basketball season. The Golden Bears, led by sixth year head coach Lindsay Gottlieb, play their home games at the Haas Pavilion and were members of the Pac-12 Conference. They finished the season 20–14, 6–12 in Pac-12 play to finish in a tie for seventh place. They advanced to the quarterfinals of the Pac-12 women's tournament where they lost to Oregon State. They received at-large bid to the NCAA women's tournament where they defeated LSU in the first round before getting blown out by Baylor in the second round.

Roster

Schedule

|-
!colspan=9 style="background:#010066; color:#FFCC33;"|Exhibition

|-
!colspan=9 style="background:#010066; color:#FFCC33;"|Non-conference regular season

|-
!colspan=9 style="background:#010066; color:#FFCC33;"| Pac-12 regular season

|-
!colspan=9 style="background:#010066; color:#FFCC33;"| Pac-12 Women's Tournament

|-
!colspan=9 style="background:#010066; color:#FFCC33;"| NCAA Women's Tournament

Rankings
2016–17 NCAA Division I women's basketball rankings

See also
2016–17 California Golden Bears men's basketball team

References

California Golden Bears women's basketball seasons
California
California
Golden Bear
Golden Bear